Cade Cameron Larson (born September 26, 1996), better known by his stage name as Cade (stylized as CADE), is an American musician, singer, songwriter and record producer. He has released three EP's.

Early life 
Cade was born in Savannah, Georgia and moved to Tampa, Florida as a child. Cade's earliest music memories were music videos of Lou Bega & Shania Twain and watching his mother sing in church. Cade started playing guitar at the age of 8, and performed for the first time at his elementary school talent show in fourth grade. Cade performed Crazy Train by Ozzy Osbourne on guitar, with his older brother playing the drums for him. At 13, Cade started writing his own songs, and learned how to record himself from an older friend who was a member of his middle school garage band.

Career

2014-2016: Career Beginnings 
Cade began writing and recording his own music while living in his parents' home in Tampa, Florida and attending H.B. Plant High School. At the age of 16, Cade, who was the president of his Junior Class, left Plant High School and switched to virtual school to focus more time on his music career. During this time, he wrote and recorded a demo that would later become 'Stay With You'. In 2016, Cade moved to Los Angeles, California, where he would live with two of his friends who had just started the DJ-trio, Cheat Codes.

2016-2018: Care EP, Pretty Girl & Stay With You 
Cade launched his solo endeavors with his EP, 'Care', which was released in July 2016 via Spinnin' Records. His debut single, 'Care' premiered exclusively on Billboard , where Cade says that he feels his sound "mixes the emotion of R&B music with the dynamic elements of electronic dance music.." "Care" was produced by Cheat Codes' Trevor Dahl, who befriended Larson on a tour in 2015. "Care" quickly turned the heads and garnered support from the likes of The Chainsmokers, Louis The Child, Chloe Grace Moretz, Pia Mia, and more.

Following the EP, Cade collaborated with electronic artist, Mokita on their song 'Monopoly', which was released by Armada. They shot a music video for the song in Amsterdam.

On February 17, 2017, Cade released 'Sorry For Myself' with Spinnin' Records. Cade wrote the single alongside Michael Pollack (musician), Lauv, Trevor Dahl, and Phil Good, and the song was produced by Dutch-DJ, R3hab. The music video has over a million views on YouTube.

In March 2017, Cade collaborated on production with pop trio, Cheat Codes, to remix Maggie Lindemann’s "Pretty Girl", which resulted in over 800 million streams on Spotify. The song achieved Platinum RIAA certification in the US and 2× Platinum BPI certification in the UK.

Cade was given an opportunity to open for some well-known artists on tour, including Ke$ha, Jeremih, and Juicy J.

Later in the year, Cade was playing some of his old demos for his roommate, Trevor Dahl. Trevor heard the demo of 'Stay With You' and asked Cade if he would be interested in making the song a collaboration with Cheat Codes. Their collaboration, "Stay with You", peaked at #35 on the US Hot Dance/Electronic Songs Chart.

2018-19: Signing To Ultra Records & WOLF BLUE. 
On June 23, 2018, CADE signed his first exclusive record-deal with Ultra Records / Sony. Cade's first release with the label was 'Strip Club' featuring Lil Aaron.

Cade was at Ultra Records' studio in Los Angeles working in a session with producer, Gazzo when he started writing a topline vocal for a beat that Gazzo had shown to Desiigner. The Panda-rapper met them at the studio where they would finish the collaboration to be called 'Home To You' featuring Desiigner.

Cade would then release two additional solo-singles, 'Yours' and 'Better Off Alone'. Simultaneously, CADE was performing overseas at festivals including We The Fest in Jakarta, Indonesia and Ultra Europe alongside Cheat Codes.

On November 15, 2019, CADE released his first EP with Ultra Records, titled 'WOLF BLUE.'. The project was inspired by a trip CADE took to the forest, and focused on his "spirit-animal", the wolf. The EP included his previous singles, as well as two additional songs, 'Too Much' and 'Crazy'.

2020-2021: Down, Kill Me Softly, & Who Set Us On Fire 
On August 14, 2020, Indonesian-DJ Dipha Barus and CADE released a collaboration titled 'Down'. The song went on to win an AMI award in Indonesia for Best Male / Solo Artist / Group Dance Collaboration. While the two artists were located on opposite sides of the world during a global pandemic, the duo managed to shoot a green-screen music video for the record that where the artists appear to be performing in outer space.

Cade then went on to release two additional solo-singles, trap-infused 'Kill Me Softly' and rock-inspired 'Who Set Us On Fire' with Ultra Records.

2021-present: Watching You Cry 
In December 2021, Cade started releasing the first three singles off of his forthcoming EP, Watching You Cry (which will be released via Ultra Records on September 16, 2022). The singles included '20 Missed Calls (featuring Nate Traveller)',  'Problem$', and '1942'.

Cade's next project, 'Watching You Cry' will be a 7-song album "inspired by heartache, passion, love, self-discovery and personal growth".

Discography

Extended plays

Charted singles

 Other singles

2016
 Care (SOURCE)
 Make You Feel Loved (SOURCE)
 Monopoly (with Mokita) (Armada Trice)
 Let Me Love You (Dastic featuring CADE) (Spinnin' Records)

2017
 Can't Take It (Breathe Carolina and Bassjackers featuring CADE) (Spinnin' Records)
 Sorry for Myself (Spinnin' Records)
 Give It to You (Niko the Kid and Bee's Knees featuring CADE) (Armada Trice)
 Done with You (Boehm featuring Cade) (Armada Deep)
 Stay with You (with Cheat Codes) (300 Entertainment)
 Where We Left (SOURCE)
 I Know You Know (featuring TK Kravitz) (CADE Music)
 Thinkin' Bout Myself (with CMC$) (Stmpd Rcrds)

2018
Warning Sign (Spinnin' Records)
Strip Club (featuring Lil Aaron ) (Ultra Records)
2019

 Home To You (featuring Desiigner) (Ultra Records)
 Yours (Ultra Records)
 Better Off Alone (Ultra Records)

2020

 Down (Dipha Barus featuring CADE) (Ultra Records)
 Kill Me Softly (Ultra Records)

2021

 Who Set Us On Fire (Ultra Records)
 20 Missed Calls (featuring Nate Traveller) (Ultra Records)

2022

 Problem$ (Ultra Records)
 1942 (Ultra Records)

References

Musicians from Tampa, Florida
Spinnin' Records artists
Living people
American electronic musicians
1996 births